The  Edmonton Eskimos season was the 58th season for the team in the Canadian Football League and their 67th overall. The Eskimos finished with a 14-4 record and in first place in the West Division for the first time since 2003. The team won the franchise's 14th Grey Cup championship 26–20 over the Ottawa Redblacks in their first Grey Cup appearance since 2005.

Offseason

CFL draft
The 2015 CFL Draft took place on May 12, 2015.

Notable transactions 

*Later traded to the Winnipeg Blue Bombers
**Later traded to the Hamilton Tiger-Cats

Preseason
On June 14, 2013, it was announced that the Edmonton Eskimos would host their 2015 preseason game at the new Shell Place in Fort McMurray against the Saskatchewan Roughriders on June 13, 2015. As part of the deal, the game was broadcast nationally on TSN. The game was played here due to scheduling conflicts with the 2015 FIFA Women's World Cup at Commonwealth Stadium and to broaden the Eskimos' fanbase. The Eskimos' second pre-season game, against the BC Lions, will also be displaced from the team's usual home stadium due to the Women's World Cup. That game will instead be played at Thunderbird Stadium on the main campus of the University of British Columbia.

Regular season

Season standings

Season schedule

Total attendance: 283,656 
Average attendance: 31,517 (56.0%)

Post season

Schedule

Team

Roster

Coaching staff

References

Edmonton Elks seasons
2015 Canadian Football League season by team
Grey Cup championship seasons